Is This Love may refer to:

 "Is This Love" (Daryl Braithwaite song)
 "Is This Love?" (Clap Your Hands Say Yeah song)
 "Is This Love?" (The Fireman song)
 "Is This Love" (Aiden Grimshaw song)
 "Is This Love" (Bob Marley & The Wailers song)
 "Is This Love?" (Alison Moyet song)
 "Is This Love?" (Bonnie Pink song)
 "Is This Love" (Survivor song)
 "Is This Love" (Whitesnake song)
 "Is This Love?", a song by Daði Freyr Pétursson
 "Is This Love", a song by Chris Brown from his 2005 album Chris Brown
 "Is This Love ('09)", a song by Eminem, featuring 50 Cent, from his 2022 album Curtain Call 2
 "Step You/Is This Love?", a 2005 song by Ayumi Hamasaki

See also 
 Is It Love? (disambiguation)